Apostolos Diamantis (born 20 May 2000) is a Greek professional footballer who plays as a centre-back for Super League club OFI.

Career
Diamantis comes from the youth ranks of PAOK. On 24 June 2019, he joined newly promoted side Volos on a season-long loan.

OFI
On 23 August 2020, Diamantis signed a four-year contract with OFI on a free transfer. He made his official debut in a 2–1 away win against Lamia, on 20 September 2020.

Career statistics

References

2000 births
Living people
Greek footballers
Greece under-21 international footballers
Greece youth international footballers
Super League Greece players
PAOK FC players
Volos N.F.C. players
OFI Crete F.C. players
Association football defenders
Footballers from Serres